Landskrona City Hall is a city hall in Landskrona that hosts the central government of Landskrona Municipality. The house is located by the new harbor, near the Sofia Albertina Church and barely half a kilometer east of the Landskrona Water Tower, which is located along the city's west coast.

The building, designed by Sten Samuelson and Inge Stoltz, was inaugurated in September 1976 and most recently underwent an interior renovation that was completed in 2021.

References

City and town halls in Sweden
Buildings and structures in Landskrona
Modernist architecture in Sweden
1976 establishments in Sweden
Government buildings completed in 1976
20th-century establishments in Skåne County
Office buildings in Sweden